František Bláha was a Czech sports shooter. He competed in the 50m team free pistol event at the 1920 Summer Olympics.

References

External links
 

Year of birth missing
Year of death missing
Czech male sport shooters
Olympic shooters of Czechoslovakia
Shooters at the 1920 Summer Olympics
Place of birth missing